The Battle of Santolo was a decisive battle between the newly declared Kano Sultanate and the Animist Hausa Kingdom of Santolo, it was the first recorded Islamic Jihad waged and fought in Sudanic Africa.

Background

In the 14th century, Islamic influence from the Mali empire had crept into Hausa land. In 1349, the King of Kano Ali Yaji I dissolved the cult of Tsumbubura, the powerful theocratic cult of the Hausa Animist religion, this sparked a wave of rebellion throughout the kingdom. At some point afterwards, the remnant of the high priests of the cult converged on Santolo, an important seat of Hausa Animism. Invigorated by religious zeal, the new 'Sultan', with the support of Wangara Muslims, descended on Santolo where the battle was fought.

Repercussions

The Battle of Santolo was to be the first in a wave conquest soon to be initiated by the Sultanate of Kano, a wave that was to see Kanoan power culminating into a Hausa Empire in the reign Sultan Muhammadu Kisoki whom according to Sultan Muhammed Bello of sokoto, " was to rule the length and breath of hausa land, from the east to the west"

See also
Yaji I

References

History of Northern Nigeria
History of Kano
Politics of Northern Nigeria
Jihad
Offensive jihad